American singer Nick Jonas has released four studio albums, one extended play (EP), and 27 singles (including four as a featured artist and nine promotional singles). In September 2005, Jonas released his eponymous debut studio album Nicholas Jonas. After serving as a member of the bands the Jonas Brothers and Nick Jonas & the Administration, Jonas returned to his solo career in 2012. On May 8, he released Songs from How to Succeed in Business Without Really Trying, an EP containing songs performed on stage during his Broadway musical of the same name.

On July 24, 2014, Jonas released "Chains" as a promotional single from his second album. The album's first single, "Jealous", was released on September 7, 2014. The song peaked at number 7 on the US Billboard Hot 100, becoming Jonas' highest-charting single in the United States to date, later being certified triple platinum. "Jealous" also peaked at number 2 on the UK Singles Chart. Jonas' second studio album, titled Nick Jonas, was released on November 10, 2014, debuting and peaking at number 6 on the Billboard 200, and remaining 46 weeks on the chart. The aforementioned single "Chains" was re-released to pop radio stations in the US on January 21, 2015, and later peaked at number 13, later receiving a double platinum certification, becoming his second biggest hit in the country. As of August 2015, Nick Jonas had sold 388,000 albums in the United States as a solo artist.

On August 21, 2015, Jonas released "Levels", intended to be the lead single from his third studio album; however, the song was instead included on a re-release of his second album called Nick Jonas X2 on November 20, 2015, alongside a new track called "Area Code" and his song with Sage the Gemini, "Good Thing". "Levels" peaked at number 44 on the Billboard Hot 100, and received a gold certification from the RIAA.

On March 25, 2016, Jonas released the lead single from his third studio album, "Close", featuring vocals by Tove Lo. The single peaked at number 14 on the Billboard Hot 100, becoming his third top 15 there, and also receiving a platinum certification. On June 10, 2016, Jonas released his third studio album, Last Year Was Complicated. The album debuted at number 2 on the Billboard 200. On July 12, Jonas released "Bacon", featuring verses by fellow singer Ty Dolla $ign, as the album's second single.

Albums

Studio albums

Reissued albums

EPs

Remix EPs

Singles

As lead artist

As featured artist

Promotional singles

Other charted songs

Guest appearances

Music videos

Notes

References

Discography
Discographies of American artists
Pop music discographies